Proppen is a small islet in the sound (Sluket or "The Gully") between Langåra and Rullesteinøya in Tiholmane, part of Thousand Islands, an archipelago south of Edgeøya.

References

 Norwegian Polar Institute Place Names of Svalbard Database

Islands of Svalbard